Staehelina is a genus of flowering plants in the tribe Cardueae within the family Asteraceae.

Species

Staehelina dubia L. - western Mediterranean
Staehelina petiolata (L.) Hilliard & B.L.Burtt - Crete + Karpathos Island
Staehelina unifloscula Sibth. & Sm. - Greece, Macedonia

 formerly included
several species now regarded as members of other genera: Athanasia Craspedia Cyrtocymura Gymnanthemum Hirtellina Jurinea Lachnospermum Liatris Ptilostemon Syncarpha Vernonia

References

Cynareae
Asteraceae genera